Phacelia eisenii is a species of phacelia known by the common name Eisen's phacelia. It is endemic to California, where it occurs only in the Sierra Nevada and its foothills, as well as the adjacent Tehachapi Mountains. It grows in mountain habitat such as coniferous forests.

Description
It is glandular and hairy in texture.

The hairy inflorescence is a small one-sided curving or coiling cyme of bell-shaped flowers.

External links
Calflora Database: Phacelia eisenii (Eisen's phacelia)
Jepson Manual Treatment - Phacelia eisenii
Phacelia eisenii — UC Photos gallery

eisenii
Endemic flora of California
Flora of the Sierra Nevada (United States)
Natural history of the Transverse Ranges
~
Flora without expected TNC conservation status